The 1930 UCI Track Cycling World Championships were the World Championship for track cycling. They took place in Brussels, Belgium from 24 to 30 August 1930. Three events for men were contested, two for professionals and one for amateurs.

Medal summary

Medal table

See also
 1930 UCI Road World Championships

References

1930 in Belgian sport
UCI Track Cycling World Championships by year
International cycle races hosted by Belgium
Sports competitions in Brussels
1930 in track cycling
August 1930 sports events
1930s in Brussels